Neil Alan Anderson (born February 21, 1947) is a Republican Idaho State Representative since 2012 representing District 31 in the A seat.

Education
Anderson earned his associate degree in mathematics from Ricks College and his bachelor's degree in business from Idaho State University.

Elections

References

External links
 Neil A. Anderson at the Idaho Legislature
 Campaign site
 
 Biography at Ballotpedia
 Financial information (state office) at the National Institute for Money in State Politics

1947 births
Living people
Brigham Young University–Idaho alumni
Idaho State University alumni
Republican Party members of the Idaho House of Representatives
People from Blackfoot, Idaho
People from Rexburg, Idaho
21st-century American politicians